The Jan Matejko Academy of Fine Arts in Kraków (usually abbreviated to ASP), is a public institution of higher education located in the centre of Kraków, Poland. It is the oldest Polish fine art academy, established in 1818 and granted full autonomy in 1873.

ASP is a state-run university that offers 5- and 6-year Master's degree programmes. As of 2007, the Academy's faculty comprised 94 professors and assistant professors as well as 147 Ph.D.s.

History
The Academy of Fine Arts (ASP) was originally a subdivision of the Jagiellonian University's Department of Literature and was initially (1818–1873) called the School of Drawing and Painting (Szkoła Rysunku i Malarstwa). Among its original teachers were Polish Neoclassicist Antoni Brodowski, and Franciszek Ksawery Lampi, a world-renowned landscape and portrait artist in Congress Poland whose most notable students there were Wojciech Korneli Stattler (a teacher of Jan Matejko) and Piotr Michałowski, equestrian master artist of the Romantic period.

ASP received the status of an independent institution of higher learning in 1873 as the School of Fine Arts (Szkoła Sztuk Pięknych). The first President of the Academy was painter Jan Matejko, who brought in other leading artists as professors including Jan Nepomucen Głowacki, the most outstanding landscape painter of the early 19th century in Poland, as well as Florian Cynk, Aleksander Gryglewski and Leopold Loeffler, member of the Vienna Academy of Fine Arts. The main building based on a neoclassical design by architect Maciej Moraczewski was erected in today's Matejko Square in 1879. In 1893–95 its principal was a broadly educated Władysław Łuszczkiewicz (another teacher of Jan Matejko and later, his close associate) who also served as conservator of architectural monuments in the city.

Following the death of Jan Matejko in 1893, the next ASP President elected in 1895 was Julian Fałat, who remained at his post until 1909. Fałat gave the Academy a new direction by hiring new art instructors associated with contemporary Western art approaches and associated painters such as Teodor Axentowicz, Jacek Malczewski (the father of Polish Symbolism), Jan Stanisławski, Leon Wyczółkowski, Konstanty Laszczka, Józef Mehoffer, Stanisław Wyspiański (one of first in Europe to work in all genres), Wojciech Weiss, and Józef Pankiewicz among others.

On the 100th anniversary of its founding, in 1979, the Academy was named for Jan Matejko, its founder and first president, who contributed greatly to its artistic legacy.

In 2008 the Academy joined Icograda (the International Council of Graphic Design Associations) and became that organization's first educational member in Poland.

Rectors
The School of Fine Arts (director)

 1873–1893: Jan Matejko
 1893–1895: Władysław Łuszczkiewicz (acting rector)
 1895–1900: Julian Fałat

The Jan Matejko Acadmy of Fine Arts in Kraków (rector)

 1900–1909: Julian Fałat (till 1905 director of The Jan Matejko Academy of Fine Arts)
 1909–1910: Leon Wyczółkowski
 1910–1911: Teodor Axentowicz
 1911–1912: Konstanty Laszczka
 1912–1914: Jacek Malczewski
 1914–1918: Józef Mehoffer
 1918–1919: Wojciech Weiss
 1919–1922: Józef Gałęzowski
 1922–1927: Adolf Szyszko-Bohusz
 1927–1928: Teodor Axentowicz
 1928–1929: Adolf Szyszko-Bohusz
 1929–1931: Konstanty Laszczka
 1931–1932: Fryderyk Pautsch
 1932–1933: Józef Mehoffer
 1933–1936: Wojciech Weiss
 1936–1939: Fryderyk Pautsch
 1945–1949: Eugeniusz Eibisch (till 1947 active rector)
 1949–1950: Zbigniew Pronaszko
 1950–1951: Zygmunt Radnicki
 1951–1952: Konrad Srzednicki
 1952–1954: Mieczysław Wejman
 1954–1967: Czesław Rzepiński
 1967–1972: Mieczysław Wejman
 1972–1980: Marian Konieczny
 1980–1987: Włodzimierz Kunz
 1987–1993: Jan Szancenbach
 1993–1996: Włodzimierz Kunz
 1996–2002: Stanisław Rodziński
 2002–2008: Jan Pamuła
 2008–2012: Adam Wsiołkowski
 2012–2020: Stanisław Tabisz
    since 2020: Andrzej Bednarczyk

Strategy (2021-2030)

The mission of the Jan Matejko Academy of Fine Arts in Kraków is to practice creativity in the fields of art, design, and conservation, as well as transferring knowledge and creative competences, spreading culture, and taking care of heritage. The most important objective is to create conditions for the development of the entire academic community and the well-being of the society at large.

Objectives and development areas 

The Academy focuses on CREATIVITY – we aspire to be a creative work environment that supports the university community in their professional, artistic and scientific development.

The Academy bolsters EDUCATION – we strive to ensure that the educational process and the organization of work adapt to the variety of needs and new phenomena.

The Academy develops RELATIONS – the Academy of Fine Arts will create a space conducive to meetings and exchanges.

The Academy nurtures its LEGACY – the Academy of Fine Arts will collect and disseminate its achievements.

Faculties

 Faculty of Painting
Department of Painting
Department of Drawing
Department of Additional Specializations
Department of Stage Design
 Faculty of Sculpture
Department of Sculpture (I, II)
Department of Drawing
Department of Architecture-Sculpture Design
 Faculty of Interior Design
 Faculty of Intermedia
 Faculty of Industrial Design
Department of Visual Communication
Department of Product Design
 Faculty of Graphic Arts
Department of Graphic Arts
Department of Graphic Design
Department of Drawing and Painting
 Faculty of Art Conservation
 Interdisciplinary Department of Art History

Notable faculty members
 Miłosz Horodyski

Notable graduates

 Bronislaw Abramowicz
 Teodor Axentowicz
 Władysław T. Benda
 Tadeusz Brzozowski
 Julian Fałat
 Stanisław Frenkiel
 Henryk Gotlib
 Artur Grottger
 Zbylut Grzywacz
 Wojciech Jerzy Has
 Maria Jarema
 Ewa Juszkiewicz
 Tadeusz Kantor
 Carl Krull
 Ephraim Moses Lilien
 Tadeusz Makowski

 Jacek Malczewski
 Anton Manastyrski
 Jan Matejko
 Józef Mehoffer
 Henryk Minkiewicz
 Igor Mitoraj
 Abraham Neumann
 Jerzy Nowosielski
 Roman Petrović
 Roman Polanski
 Stanislaw Przespolewski
 Heinrich Rauchinger
 Tadeusz Rychter
 Wilhelm Sasnal
 Edward Rydz-Śmigły

 Czesław Słania
 Adam Studziński
 Boguslaw Szwacz
 Zoja Trofimiuk 
 Petar Tiješić
 Stanisław Tondos
 Ivan Trush
 Andrzej Wajda
 Wojciech Weiss
 Andrzej Wróblewski
 Leon Wyczółkowski
 Stanisław Wyspiański
 Mariusz Zaruski

See also
 Culture of Kraków
 List of Poles

References

External links
 Official website 
  Universities of Krakow

 
Educational institutions established in 1818
Universities and colleges in Kraków
Arts organizations established in the 1810s
1818 establishments in Poland